Saros cycle series 129 for lunar eclipses occurs at the moon's descending node, repeats every 18 years  days.
The 129th lunar saros is associated with Solar Saros 136.

Lunar saros 129 contains 71 member events, with 70 eclipses in which the penumbral (or eclipse) magnitude is over 0.01 . It has 11 total eclipses, starting in 1910 and ending in 2090.

Solar saros 136 interleaves with the 129th lunar saros, with an event occurring every 9 years 5 days alternating between each saros series. It consisted of 10 penumbral eclipses, 21 partial eclipses, 11 total eclipses, 21 partial eclipses, and ends with 8 penumbral eclipses.

Summary

List

See also 
 List of lunar eclipses
 List of Saros series for lunar eclipses

Notes

External links 
 

Lunar saros series